Robert F. Carr Memorial Chapel of St. Savior, "God Box", is a modest, one-story brick building situated near the intersection of Michigan Avenue and 32nd Street on the Illinois Institute of Technology (IIT) campus in Chicago, Illinois, United States.   Notably, this is the only nonsecular structure designed by German-American modern architect, Ludwig Mies van der Rohe, who at the time served as the director of the School of Architecture.

Bishop Wallace Conkling of the Episcopal Diocese of Chicago proposed the construction of the chapel in the late 1940s with the notion that it would be a "great educational project of the atomic age." IIT's religious and spiritual organizations currently use the "God Box" as a "center of campus spiritual life" for meditation, weekly services, and other meetings.

History

Proposal 

Bishop Conkling presented his proposal to fund and build a chapel complex with a meeting hall and parish house at IIT to bridge the gap between education and religion after World War II. He believed the location of the chapel would spur students to "search for virtue while becoming proficient in the search for things."

Design and Construction 
IIT's  administrators selected influential modernist architect, Mies van der Rohe, to design the chapel.
Before the chapel, Mies had already designed other IIT buildings which often had to be modified to accommodate university budget cuts. The original proposal in 1949 consisted of two buildings: a chapel and a parish house. Mies' initial designs consisted of a  chapel and a parish house. Interestingly, his perspective sketch has a "steel superstructure bracketed with opaque sidewalls." After university administrators decreased funding, the design excluded the parish house design, although the steel frame was still in the plan. Once well into the construction phase, administrators still felt that the design would result in exorbitant costs. Mies reduced the chapel to a  building with load-bearing bricks, instead of steel, that held steel beams to support a concrete roof. Recovered designs also reveal missing aspects such as companion pieces to the crucifix and white-oak pews. Despite the financial setbacks, Mies completed the chapel in 1952 without elaborate, ornate religious decorations.

Intended Purpose and Current Use 
Bishop Conkling allegedly wanted to increase the presence of the Episcopal Church on campus by creating a place where students could engage deeper in faith.
Despite Conkling's apparent intention and church sponsorship, the final design did not include a parish house for the chaplain. Instead, Mies designed a modest yellow-brick prism whose only decorative features are the white, silk curtain behind the steel cross and the unadorned Roman travertine altar below it. Mies' simple plan for the small chapel was apparently intended to be conducive to inward contemplation.
Interestingly, the university's desire to make a nondenominational structure may have caused the funding cuts. In fact, the administration later ensured that the building was open to students of all faiths. People currently use the chapel for both secular and nonsecular events such as Sunday services and weddings.

Architecture 

Robert F. Carr Memorial Chapel is a simple, unadorned rectangular box-like structure with a horizontally level roof sitting on a steel frame and a concrete layer.

Below the black steel cornice, there are several layers of uniform, load-bearing yellow bricks. The front and back of the chapel contain plate glass set in thin, black steel frames. The interior only has two sources of lighting: natural from the front entrance and artificial from the ceilings of the side walls. The dark terrazzo flooring and lack of quintessential religious decorations direct the focus to the thin stainless steel crucifix against Shantung silk curtains. An altar and its platform of solid Roman travertine sit below the cross.

Renovations 

During the 1990s, parts of the top and corners of the walls became damaged without repair for many years.

Mies van der Rohe Society raised more than $1 million to restore the chapel by the end of the summer in 2013. Dean of Architecture, Donna Robertson, assisted in the restoration project, which began in 2008. Restoration was set for  "roof replacement, repairs and replacement of exterior glass and steel, reconstruction of exterior brick corners, refinishing of terrazzo floor, cleaning and repairs to interior brick, upgraded mechanical and electrical components, refinishing of wood doors and benches, cleaning of concrete ceiling panels, lighting replacement, renovation to create ADA-compliant restroom and passageway, and accommodations for air conditioning." The roof and the rest of the exterior were replaced in the summer of 2009.
The restoration project devoted special attention to replacing the drapes behind the cross to ensure that the material and color of the drapes suit the textures and shades of the rest of the chapel while also maintaining Mies' "clean" style. Gene Summers, Mies' assistant, was consulted to create the new curtains now composed of fire-retardant fibers and pongee silk. The curtain was woven in Italy, and the pleating was done by Cornel Erdbeer, the president of Ludwig Interiors.
Chicago's Harboe Architects led the restoration and strove to maintain the "form and function" of the chapel, according to Chicago Tribune. The company restored the roof, bricks, mortar joints, steel frames, flooring, doors, and benches and removed graffiti, shrubs, and water stains. Harboe replaced the drainage system with a concealed rooftop edge for rainwater flow. Further, the bricks to replace the cracked exterior wall came from an auxiliary wall of Bailey Hall, an IIT dorm constructed three years after the chapel. Bernacki & Associates restored the panels and chairs.

References

Illinois Institute of Technology
Ludwig Mies van der Rohe buildings
Religious buildings and structures in Chicago